Scaphyglottis stellata is a species of orchid occurring from Central America to tropical South America.

References

External links

stellata
Plants described in 1839